, also romanized as Bunreki, was a  after Tenpuku and before Katei. This period spanned the years from November 1234 to September 1235.

Change of era
 1234 :  The era name was changed to mark an event or a number of events. The previous era ended and a new one commenced in Tenpuku 2.

Events of the Bunryaku Era
 1234 (Bunryaku 1, 12th month):  Kujō Yoritsune is raised to the first rank of the third class in the court hierarchy (the dōjō kuge).

Notes

References
 Nussbaum, Louis-Frédéric and Käthe Roth. (2005).  Japan encyclopedia. Cambridge: Harvard University Press. ;  OCLC 58053128
 Titsingh, Isaac. (1834). Nihon Odai Ichiran; ou,  Annales des empereurs du Japon.  Paris: Royal Asiatic Society, Oriental Translation Fund of Great Britain and Ireland. OCLC 5850691
 Varley, H. Paul. (1980). A Chronicle of Gods and Sovereigns: Jinnō Shōtōki of Kitabatake Chikafusa. New York: Columbia University Press. ;  OCLC 6042764

External links
 National Diet Library, "The Japanese Calendar" -- historical overview plus illustrative images from library's collection

Japanese eras
1230s in Japan